Saktiawan Sinaga (born 19 February 1982 in Medan, North Sumatra) is an Indonesian tarkam footballer who plays as a forward in Liga 3 for the club of Medan Utama.

Personal life 
His parents are Sudin Sinaga (father) and Sulastri (mother). He has 2 children with his wife Nadila Soraya Lubis, they are Sheva Nazua Sinaga (4 years) and Deryl Syuza (5 months). Normally, people call him Sakti or Wawan.

Club career 
On 5 May 2009, when playing with Persik Kediri against Persija Jakarta, suddenly he fell unconscious and stretch to the edge of the pitch. After remaining unconscious for 2 minutes, he was carried to Narrow Hospital, RSUD Gambiran.

He was diagnosed with a heart disease, high cholesterol, and exhaustion from play Persik Kediri against Deltras Sidoarjo on 1 May 2009. In December 2014, he was reported to have joined Perseru Serui.

On January 20, 2015, he signed with Pusamania and was assigned the number 20.

International career 
His debut on the Senior Team was at the Tiger Cup 2004. Saktiawan Sinaga scored the first goal for Indonesia in the 2007 AFF Championship tournament against Laos.

International goals

Honours

Club
PSMS Medan
 Bang Yos Gold Cup (3): 2004, 2005, 2006

International 
Indonesia
 AFF Championship runner-up: 2004

References

External links 
 
 

Indonesian footballers
1982 births
Living people
Sportspeople from Medan
PSMS Medan players
Persik Kediri players
People of Batak descent
PSPS Pekanbaru players
PSDS Deli Serdang players
Semen Padang F.C. players
Mitra Kukar players
Liga 1 (Indonesia) players
Indonesia international footballers
Association football forwards